Peters Run is a  long 3rd order tributary to Little Wheeling Creek in Ohio County, West Virginia.

Variant names 
According to the Geographic Names Information System, it has also been known historically as:
 Peter's Run
 Peters Creek

Course 
Peters Run rises about 1 mile south of Clinton, West Virginia, in Ohio County and then flows south-southwest to join Little Wheeling Creek in the Elm Grove neighborhood of Wheeling.

Watershed 
Peters Run drains  of area, receives about 40.9 in/year of precipitation, has a wetness index of 281.81, and is about 67% forested.

See also 
 List of rivers of West Virginia

References 

Rivers of Ohio County, West Virginia
Rivers of West Virginia